Giulia Daysi Gam (born 28 December 1966) is a Brazilian actress.

Biography
Giulia was born in Perugia when her father, José Carlos Gam Heuss, was taking a course. She has a Danish grandfather.

Career 
She became famous in Brazil after performing the young Jocasta Silveira in the soap opera Mandala and since then started a meteoric career in television, despite being one of the most seminal thespians of Brazil.
      
Giulia's biography registers a respectable stage career, from which she was chosen for her debut in Rede Globo, Giulia played the character Jocasta, when young, in the telenovela Mandala (the adult Jocasta was portrayed by actress Vera Fischer). Giulia came to the telenovela without any experience in television, other than some ads and videos made by friends from an independent film company. She carried out four years of exhaustive and obsessive work in theatre. In the stage, Giulia debuted under direction of Antunes Filho, in the Shakespeare's play Romeo and Juliet, in São Paulo, in 1984.

With Antunes Filho's company she travelled in a long tour by Australia, Europe, U.S. and Israel. After it dissolved, she travelled to Paris, where she found Peter Brook, who motivated her to go on with her stage career.

In January 1987, back to Brazil, Giulia joined the cast of the Jean Racine play Phèdre, invited by actress Fernanda Montenegro. In October of the same year, she debuted in TV, with a huge success.

Personal life 
By the end of the 1980s, she was in a relationship with musician Tony Bellotto.

Filmography

Television 
 1987 - Mandala.... Jocasta (Young)
 1988 - O Primo Basílio.... Luísa
 1989 - Que Rei Sou Eu?.... Aline
 1991 - Vamp.... Lucia
 1992 - Procura-se
 1992 - Você Decide, Laços de Família
 1993 - Caso Especial, O Alienista
 1993 - Caso Especial, Lucíola
 1993 - Caso Especial, Lisbela e o Prisioneiro
 1993 - Retrato de Mulher, Era Uma Vez .... Leila
 1993 - Fera Ferida.... Linda Inês
 1995 - A Comédia da Vida Privada, Casados x Solteiros.... Ana
 1995 - A Comédia da Vida Privada, Sexo na Cabeça.... Camila
 1996 - A Comédia da Vida Privada, Como Destruir Seu Casamento
 1996 - A Comédia da Vida Privada, Drama
 1996 - A Vida como Ela É...
 1998 - Dona Flor e Seus Dois Maridos.... Dona Flor
 1999 - Você Decide, Numa e Ninfa 
 2000 - Brava Gente
 2001 - Os Normais, Faça o seu Pedido.... Clara
 2001 - A Padroeira.... Antonieta
 2002 - A Grande Família, Os Boçais.... Jaqueline
 2002 - Os Normais, Desconfianças Normais.... Taís
 2003 - Mulheres Apaixonadas.... Heloísa Morais
 2004 - Celebridade.... Herself
 2004 - A Diarista, Quem vai ficar com Marinete?.... Nanci
 2005 - A Diarista, É fria, Marinete!.... Rogelma
 2005 - A História de Rosa
 2005 - Bang Bang.... Vegas Locomotiv / Moll Flanders
 2007 - Eterna Magia.... Regina Ferreira / Shirleyd / Raimunda Ferreira
 2008 - A Favorita.... Diva Palhares / Rosana Costa / Kato / Miranda
 2009 - Força-Tarefa, Temporada de Caça.... Cláudia
 2009 - Aline.... Sofia
 2010 - Ti Ti Ti.... Bruna Soares Sampaio
 2011 - Chico Xavier .... Rita
 2011 - A Grande Família, A República do Salto Alto.... Estela
 2011 - A Grande Família, A Noite Perfeita.... Estela
 2012 - As Brasileiras.... Soraya
 2012 - Amor Eterno Amor.... Laura Belize
 2012 - Guerra dos Sexos.... Gisele
 2013 - Sangue Bom.... Bárbara Ellen (Conceição da Silva)
 2014 - Boogie Oogie .... Carlota Veiga Azevedo Braga

Selected films
 1987 - Besame Mucho
 2005 - Árido Movie
 2010 - Chico Xavier
 2011 - Assalto ao Banco Central

References

External links 
 

1966 births
Living people
People from Perugia
Brazilian people of Danish descent
Brazilian telenovela actresses
Brazilian stage actresses
20th-century Brazilian actresses
21st-century Brazilian actresses